Ptghnavank (Armenian: Պտղնավանք) or Ptghni temple (Armenian:Պտղնի Վանք) is located in the village of Ptghni in the Kotayk Province of Armenia.

Architecture 
The temple is a domed single-nave basilica type completed in the 6th or 7th century. Presently, the only surviving parts of the temple are most of the north wall, part of the south wall with one of the four impost arches of the dome, and some traces of the vaulting. The cupola and ceiling vaults, drum, and dome have since collapsed. 

The church is noteworthy for its relief sculpture. Around the window casings, vegetal and geometric patterns may be found.  
Some restoration work had been done to the church in 1940.

Gallery

References

External links

 Armenian Architectural Studies
 Armeniapedia.org: Ptghavank
 Armenica.org: Ptghni Church

Christian monasteries in Armenia
Tourist attractions in Kotayk Province
Buildings and structures in Kotayk Province